Minerva "Mini" McGuinness is a fictional character from the third generation of the British teen drama Skins, played by Freya Mavor. She appears in the fifth and sixth series of the show.

Characterisation
Mini is Scottish and is considered to be the queen bee at Roundview College. She describes herself as "the sweetest girl you will ever meet", but the sweetness is shown to be a façade; Mini will stop at nothing to gain and keep social power, even to the detriment of others. Mini claims that her four favourite things are: "Shopping. Footwear. Sushi. Sex. (And yes, always in that order)." Despite her confident exterior, she is insecure and self-conscious about her weight, to the point where she is seen carefully weighing her food before eating, suggesting that she has an eating disorder.

According to Mavor, "Mini is quite a feisty figure; she's the top dog of the school... or at least she likes to think she is. She's witty and she definitely likes people to hear her opinion. She likes to stir things up, test people and manipulate things around her to see what would happen, but I don't think she means to do bad. She doesn't really think about the consequences of her actions a lot of the time though."

Much of the fifth series deals with Mini slowly losing her power, as Franky Fitzgerald's arrival threatens her relationship with her best friends Grace Blood and Liv Malone. She also deals with the dissolution of her relationship with her boyfriend Nick Levan, as he slowly begins to gain feelings for Liv. As the series progresses, she develops a closer friendship with Franky, eventually starting to become a mother figure to her.

Prior to the start of the sixth series, Dakota Blue Richards (Franky) hints about the possibility of a Franky and Mini romance. In the latter part of the sixth series, Mavor points out that Franky's possessiveness of Mini is due to her becoming a nurturing and motherly figure to her.

In the sixth series, Mini becomes an integral part of the group, fixes her relationships with Nick, Liv, and Grace, and becoming a mother-figure to Franky. She also begins a secret sexual relationship with Alo Creevey (whom she affectionately nicknames "Farmboy").

Character history

Series 5
In "Franky", Mini, the queen of her group, is the first to call out Franky on her androgynous clothes. Mini eventually clashes with Franky during a violent field hockey game. Afterwards, however, Mini says they should let bygones be bygones and says Franky can hang out with her two friends, Grace and Liv. They invite her into their group, proceed to take MDMA and go shopping. However, Mini starts to antagonise Franky, who rejects her materialistic outlook on life, and looks to steal Grace and Liv away. After finding out why Franky left Oxford (being severely bullied), Mini persuades boyfriend Nick to post embarrassing photos of Franky around the college, which leads to Mini and Franky falling out.

Later, at Mini's party, Franky confronts Mini about her behaviour and Mini reveals that Franky was only invited as a joke and Grace and Liv were in on it. After Franky leaves in tears, Liv tells Mini that she needs to be more mature and act like someone who's old enough to be in college. Mini then asks Liv where Grace went, not knowing that Grace, having liked Franky from the start, had left the party to hang out with her and make amends.

In "Rich", she is seen briefly with Liv, crashing Grace's ballet practice, where she pretends to have no problem with Grace hanging out with Alo, Rich, and Franky, although she later insults them.

In "Mini", Mini has been arranging a charity fashion show with her school committee, but is outraged to discover that Grace has recruited Franky to help with the clothing designs. Out of pride, she decides to handle it herself with her boyfriend, Nick Levan. Nick, meanwhile, is hoping to consummate their three-month relationship. Unbeknownst to Nick, Mini is still a virgin, but is too afraid to admit it, and is scared of losing her virginity. She attempts to put off having sex for several days, until she and Liv go on a double date with Nick and his friend, Rider, at the Bowling Alley. To put off having sex further, she hides Nick's keys in her handbag but Rider suggests they go back to his place. There Rider and Liv start to have sex, and Nick pressures Mini to do the same. However, due to some medication she intentionally took earlier, she winds up vomiting on him before they can have sex, forcing him and Liv to take Mini home and stay the night.

The next day, Mini wakes up and sees Liv and Nick sleeping next to each other and misunderstands the situation. During the day, she discovers that the students know about her vomiting incident (with Grace and Franky and their group mocking her because of it) and believes that it was Liv who spread the story. She then attempts to call Liv about the fashion show, and, upon finding Nick's phone in the changing room, she discovers three calls had been placed to it from Liv, and then sees her dancing with Nick outside. Fearing the worst, she confronts Liv and discovers that the costumes don't fit her or the other models and that there are not enough and the routines are still yet to be choreographed. Overwhelmed with pressure, she faints, and is informed that she can no longer produce the show, and is sent home.

Realising that she cannot put off having sex with Nick at the risk of losing him, Mini dresses herself up and returns and discovers that Grace and Franky's designs have been used, to a standing ovation. Later, at a rave, Mini confronts Liv about her apparent attraction to Nick, accusing her of being jealous of her, and has a fight with her and Grace before storming out and crying. Seeing this, a compassionate Franky approaches and talks Mini into returning. As they return, Mini sees Nick and Liv leaving a small janitor's closet rearranging their clothes and realises they just had sex. Mini then entices Nick to take her back to his place, and finally loses her virginity to him. The next day, she finds Nick had gone to practice, and sadly returns home.

In "Liv", Mini, remembering Franky's kindness to her, decides to make amends with her and her gang, forcing Liv to do so in the process. After bringing out a bag of spliff, they begin an impromptu party at Liv's home. When Liv returns the next day with Matty, they discover Nick and Mini having sex in Liv's bed. Nick, upon emerging from the covers, recognises Matty at once as his brother and immediately warns Liv to stay away from him. Liv and Nick admit to Mini that they had sex, so she can no longer pretend it didn't happen. Enraged, Mini later forces Liv to drink an entire bottle of vodka as a means of apology (after hearing she had done the same thing with Matty) before leaving her to suffer.

In "Nick", Nick and Mini have another awkward sexual encounter, motivated by Nick's jealousy that his brother has been having sex with Liv. Later on, Mini spitefully dances with Nick's friend, Rider, at a bar. Drunk and angry, Nick punches Rider in the face and in an ensuing confrontation with Mini, she reveals angrily that she had known all along that he had been cheating on her, and finally breaks up with him.

In "Alo", Mini joins the gang at Alo's farm for a party. At the party, she sidles up to Franky on a couch and reveals to her that she is well aware of Franky's crush on Matty, though Franky vehemently denies it, and encourages her to pursue him ("Liv'll do it to you in a second"). Later on, while continuing the party at Nick's house, Alo collapses on a couch beside Mini and weeps at having messed everything up. Mini consoles him, telling him that he is 'alright' and later gets up to dance with him.

In "Grace", Mini is a member of Grace's production of '‘Twelfth Night'’, and has developed a much closer friendship with Franky. At a girls' night at Grace's house, she discovers for the first time that Grace's father is David Blood, the school headmaster. And it is Mini who finally talks Franky into discussing her sexuality. Later on, while standing in for Liv (who had quit), Mini hesitantly kisses Franky at the suggestion of Grace, much to the shock of Rich and Alo.

In "Everyone", Mini has become very protective of Franky after witnessing her confrontation with Liv and Matty at the end of the production of Twelfth Night. Before Grace and Rich's wedding, she angrily warns Matty to stay away from Franky, and very gently tries to advise Franky that she "deserves better." However, when Matty and Liv lose confidence in Alo's navigation skills, they invite Franky to join them, and despite Mini's pleas, she goes with them. Mini, however, continues to worry about what will happen, as she has a sense that something bad is going to happen. Eventually, she deserts Alo and Nick and leaves to find the three herself. She runs into Liv, who has been separated from Matty and Franky, and reveals her fears of losing Franky, causing Liv to ask if Mini has a crush on Franky, which she does not deny. The two finally reconcile. After seeing Franky run past, having a panic attack, Mini stops Matty and realises they have attempted to have sex. Fearing for Franky's safety, the three all run after her. Franky accidentally trips up and falls over the side of a cliff. After Liv manages to pull Franky to safety, a horrified Mini hugs Franky. She eventually calms Franky down, and the two have a short talk outside Grace's marquee.

Series 6
In "Everyone", Mini goes on a holiday to Morocco with the rest of the gang. She is shown to have developed a crush on Alo, who repeatedly shows signs of attraction towards her. At the villa, she is annoyed to find that Rider has failed to get the water running, eventually punching him in the face for making sleazy jokes about her. The gang later attend a party, where Mini notices Alo stealing a phone from someone's clothes. The next morning, she wakes up and finds Franky, Liv, and Nick all passed out. She successfully gets the water running and takes a shower in the pool before going to Alo's room and seducing him and demanding he not say anything about it to anyone. When the group later attends another party, the two of them agree to continue their sexual relationship on the condition that nobody finds out. Mini's crush on Franky has died down, as seen when she mentions to Liv that she preferred Franky's old personality.

In "Rich", Mini is trying to deal with Grace's coma and is waiting for her to wake up. She is first mentioned in this episode when she texts Alo asking him where he is and then later in the episode when Rich and Alo are slumming in the Blood's house, Rich catches Mini and Alo in the middle of having sex and Mini swears him to secrecy as she want to keep her relationship with Alo private and also confronts him on why she wasn't told that Grace had woken up. She is later seen leaving the Blood's house and is caught by Liv and Franky when Rider comes to pick her up. When asked why she was even there in the first place, Rich covers for her saying she was collecting her straighteners. Later at the party, she is seen dancing with Liv and Franky before later on kissing a random guy whilst Alo looks on, obviously jealous.

In "Alex", Mini is first seen in the corridor and is cornered by Liv and is accused of avoiding her. When Liv brings up the topic of Grace, Mini automatically leaves. She is then seen in the canteen by Alex sitting across from Liv and neither of them speak. Later in the episode Mini is at the Pub with the Gang and downs several shots, calls the others boring, and begins to dance with a boy in the pub. Mini is watched by an uncomfortable Alo which Alex comments about Mini and Alo being a couple, which Liv is quick to shoot down. Mini then goes to Grace's memorial with Franky and Liv but their presence proves disruptive as Franky interrupts a ridiculous tribute to Grace and Liv then smashes a keyboard and flashes the mourners for the over-the-top arrangements. Along with the rest of the gang, Mini goes to party on Alex's boat but still seems distant from the rest of the group. When Liv tries to talk to her, Mini quickly brushes her off and says she's fine. Mini and Liv later discover the body of Alex's grandmother and she screams for Alo. Mini then helps to set Alex's grandmother's coffin out to sea, but is seen to be crying as Alex reads a postcard written from his grandad to his grandmother. Mini is then seen leaving the ceremony as Franky says that if Alex's gran sees Grace to tell her they miss her.

In "Franky", Mini is seen with the rest of the gang sitting her mock A-levels and is then confronted by Franky over a comment she makes as Franky is dropped off at Roundview by Luke. Franky accuses Mini of blaming her for the accident. Mini then responds by asking her what is wrong with her.

In "Mini", Mini is having sex with Alo in a nightclub toilet, where he breaks the terms of their 'no-strings-attached' relationship by declaring he loves her. Freaked out, she returns home, but is kept awake by her mother and her irritating new live-in boyfriend having sex. After having an argument with her mother, Shelley, about it the next day, Mini calls her father, Gregory, and arranges to meet up at a local aquarium. The meeting goes well, and Mini begins to rebuild her relationship with Gregory, to the chagrin of her mother. As she begins to integrate herself into his life, including arranging to go to and flirt with his assistant, she begins distancing herself from her friends at school. However, she has been hiding a dark secret that she cannot hide forever – she is pregnant. The only person who notices is Franky, who recognises Mini's regular vomiting as morning sickness; Mini's defensive attitude when questioned about it only serves to confirm Franky's suspicions. Although Franky promises not to say anything, Mini's irritable temper starts to alienate her from the others, including Liv and Alo.

Things come to a head when the gang crashes a party that Gregory arranged, and Alo, after snorting some cocaine, is compelled to march over and confront Gregory's assistant, whom he believes has feelings for Mini. This upsets a lot of fellow partygoers, resulting in Alo being thrown out and Mini declaring they're finished. Mini then seduces Gregory's assistant and they go off to have sex, but he stops himself, fearing for his job, and politely leaves. He is replaced by Liv, who wants to talk to Mini about why she's acting so strangely. After Mini makes Liv storm out, Franky questions Mini about her pregnancy, and discovers that Mini hasn't actually come to terms with being pregnant. After some gentle coaxing, Mini goes to her father and confesses to the pregnancy. They then make arrangements to fly to Sydney and Mini goes home to pack. Her mother implores her not to go, but Mini coldly brushes her off. She returns to her father's home, but finds it completely empty – he has emigrated just as Mini had feared he would, leaving a note saying "Sorry. I love you" and a cheque for £500. Mini tries to ring him, but he is already on the plane, and she collapses in the kitchen, ripping up the note as she cries. She then goes to Alo in the hope of making up with him, but he coldly tells her that he is fed up with her treatment and asks her to leave. She returns home and discovers her mother weeping in the kitchen. Her boyfriend comes outside to smoke a cigarette, and finds Mini there, and she implores him not to do to her mother what her father did. The next day, Franky escorts Mini to an ultrasound clinic. There, an initially reluctant Mini is implored to look at the scan, and breaks down in tears of joy as she sees her baby for the first time on the screen.

In the next three episodes, Mini attempts to tell Alo she's pregnant, but every chance she gets, her courage disappears.

In "Mini and Franky", Mini has been spending all her time with Franky, who is excited for the arrival of her baby. However, on the way to an ultrasound appointment, Mini collapses and fears something is wrong with the baby. She is taken to the hospital where she is told she is having a baby girl and is assured that her baby is fine. A few minutes later during an ultrasound, Shelley and Alo walk in and finally find out that Mini is pregnant. Alo reacts badly, throwing up upon finding out and Shelley wants her to give up the baby, not seeming to care about Mini's feelings, even calling her a "fucking fool" for not wanting an abortion. When her mother begins to make arrangements to have the baby put up for adoption, Mini runs off with Franky. They go to a homeless shelter masquerading as a lesbian couple, but are kicked out the next day. Unwilling to lose the only maternal figure in her life, Franky tries to convince Mini to go to Oxford with her, but Mini instead decides to go home, stating she will only return if her mother allows her to keep her baby. When Mini arrives home, her mother tells her the story of how she almost miscarried with Mini. Shelley decides to let Mini keep the baby and the two make up, which sends Franky running out of the house in tears. Rich picks up Mini and takes her to Alo's farm where he has set up their own personal pad were they can live. While dancing with Alo, Mini discovers blood running down her leg.

In "Finale", after a while in the hospital, Mini is recovering from a near miscarriage. When Liv lashes out at Franky for her melodramatic behaviour, Mini stands up for Franky and calls Liv off, before ordering her out of the room. She then hugs the crying Franky, and advises her to confront Nick and Matty over their love triangle. Alo gets Mini's gynaecologist to allow her to go to Alex's party as long as she won't dance or drink. At the party with Liv, Mini goes into labour and then later gives birth to her daughter, whom they (presumably) name Grace McGuinness Creevey, with Alo and Liv by her side.

Reception

Heather Hogan of AfterEllen called Mini "gay as a window", a quote Emily Fitch used in her solo central episode to describe Graham the hairdresser.

References

External links
 First character profile at E4.com
 Second character profile at E4.com
 Character profile at Facebook
 Character profile at Twitter
 Character profile at the Internet Movie Database

Skins (British TV series) characters
Television characters introduced in 2011
Fictional Scottish people
Fictional bisexual females
Fictional teenage parents
British female characters in television
Female characters in television
Teenage characters in television
Fictional LGBT characters in television